The Hertha Formation is a geologic formation in Missouri. It preserves fossils dating back to the Carboniferous period.

See also

 List of fossiliferous stratigraphic units in Missouri
 Paleontology in Missouri

References
 

Carboniferous Missouri
Carboniferous Kansas
Carboniferous geology of Oklahoma
Carboniferous southern paleotropical deposits